Jörg A. Eggers (born 15 June 1936) is a German film director and screenwriter. He directed 46 films between 1965 and 1998.

Selected filmography
 I Want to Live (1976)
 Das Nest unter den Trümmern der Jahre  (1982, TV film)
 Die Nacht der vier Monde (1984)

References

External links

1936 births
Living people
Mass media people from Heidelberg